Semondans is a commune in the Doubs department in the Bourgogne-Franche-Comté region in eastern France.

Geography
The Rupt flows through the commune.

Population

See also
 Communes of the Doubs department

References

External links

 Semondans on the regional Web site 

Communes of Doubs
County of Montbéliard